Blade Man (lit. Iron Man) is a 2014 South Korean television series starring Lee Dong-wook and Shin Se-kyung. It aired on KBS2 from September 10 to November 13, 2014 for 18 episodes.

Plot
Joo Hong-bin (Lee Dong-wook) is a wealthy man with a prickly demeanor who develops a supernatural ability - his anger and mental pain manifest as knives sprouting from his body. He meets Son Se-dong (Shin Se-kyung), a warmhearted girl who becomes entangled in his life. As they fall in love, she slowly heals his heart and he learns to deal with his inner pain and newfound power.

Cast

Main characters 
Lee Dong-wook as Joo Hong-bin
Shin Se-kyung as Son Se-dong
Kim Kap-soo as Joo Jang-won
Han Eun-jung as Kim Tae-hee

Supporting characters 
Jung Yoo-geun as Joo Chang
Lee Mi-sook as Madam Yoon
Han Jung-soo as Secretary Go
Lee Joo-seung as Joo Hong-joo
Kim Sun-woong as Kyung Ho	
Yoon Da-kyung as Yeon Mi-jung
Song Kyung-chul as Gardener
Shin Seung-hwan as Seung-hwan
Sun Woong as Kyung-ho
Kim Jae-young as Je-gil
Kang Da-bin as Soo-jae
Jin Ju-hyung as Jung-joon
Lee Seung-ho as Go Yoon-seok
Kim Hyung-bum as Se-dong's senior colleague
Ra Mi-ran as Elisa Park
Jung Jin as Oh Joong-shik
Lee Dal-hyung as Chauffeur
Choi Young-in as Housekeeper
Kim Mi-kyung as Housekeeper
Kim Poo-reun Ba-da as Kim Sun-woo
Kim Kyu-chul as Jo Bong-gu
Kim Sun-hye as Tae-hee's colleague
Lee Seung-ho as Yoon-seok
Son Young-hak 
Park Gun-rak

Original soundtrack

Part 1

Part 2

Part 3

Part 4

Ratings

References

External links
  
 
 
 

2014 South Korean television series debuts
2014 South Korean television series endings
Korean Broadcasting System television dramas
South Korean romantic fantasy television series
Television series by IHQ (company)